The Community Development & Leadership Summit (CDLS) is an annual international summit held for high school juniors. It has been annually held in New Delhi, India since 2006. It is hosted by Modern School Barakhamba Road.

Location
The Modern School is located on Barakhamba Road, New Delhi.

2007 Conference
CDLS 2007 was held from Sunday 28 October to Thursday 8 November 2007.

The participants in CDLS2007 will include delegations from Australia, China, Japan, Malaysia, Pakistan, Saudi Arabia, Singapore, Sri Lanka, Ukraine, The United States of America and India. Each contingent will comprise 4 students (2 boys and 2 girls) from Senior Secondary or/and Secondary grades along with 1 accompanying teacher. It is expected that the ideas exchanged during the summit will empower students to understand the role of leadership in community development. 

Besides numerous seminars and workshops conducted by well known personalities from their respective fields and areas, the participants will also be taken for local sightseeing and a trip to Taj Mahal at Agra. All expenses inclusive of lodging, boarding and activities related to the summit will be borne by the host school. Its noted participants include Parnab Mookerje, F. Bakhtyar Ahmed, Shri Shri Avi Gujjar, Eric Arthur Blair, Underwood Clare and Leonardo DaCaprio.

Since 2007, more countries have been added such as Germany, Mexico and Italy.

Accommodations
The participants and visiting teachers will be staying in the school's boarding house. The participants will also be given an opportunity to enjoy home stay with some of the Modern School's students to get an insight into the culture and values of the Indian community.

References
Some references from around the world:  
 http://www.pymblelc.nsw.edu.au/news/community-development-and-leadership-summit/
 http://www.modernschool.net/international-programme-cdls.html
 https://web.archive.org/web/20170613034516/http://www.greensboroday.org/page.cfm?p=14
 https://web.archive.org/web/20160507082612/http://modernschoolec.com/community-development-leadership-summit-15/
 https://www.lnsyzx-international.com/2015-india-cdls
 http://www.dpssrinagar.com/news/dipsites-attend-cdl-summit-celebrate-diversity-unity/
 http://www.townleygrammar.org.uk/media/93463/CDLS-2015-Schedule.pdf
 http://www.sundayguardianlive.com/lifestyle/7420-world-leaders-tomorrow-gather-modern-school-s-international-summit
 http://www.thestar.com.my/news/community/2014/08/11/gritty-girl-beats-the-odds-partially-blind-student-bags-tyt-award-for-excelling-in-her-studies/

External links
 The Modern School

Academic conferences
International conferences
Youth conferences